Gabriella Palm  (born 20 May 1998) is an Australian water polo player.

Palm was a member of the Australian Stingrays squad that competed at the Tokyo 2020 Olympics. The head coach was Predrag Mihailović. By finishing second in their pool, the Aussie Stingers went through to the quarterfinals. They were beaten 8-9 by Russia and therefore did not compete for an Olympic medal. Australia at the 2020 Summer Olympics details the team's performance in depth.

References

External links
Profile – LinkedIn
 

1998 births
Living people
Australian female water polo players
Water polo players at the 2020 Summer Olympics
Sportspeople from Brisbane
Sportswomen from Queensland
Olympic water polo players of Australia
20th-century Australian women
21st-century Australian women